The Heavenly Kid is a 1985 American romantic comedy fantasy film directed by Cary Medoway and starring Lewis Smith, Jason Gedrick, Jane Kaczmarek and Richard Mulligan.

Plot 
In the early 1960s, Bobby Fontana (Lewis Smith), a young greaser-type rebel, challenges Joe Barnes (Mark Metcalf) to a game of chicken for making a pass at his girlfriend Emily (Jane Kaczmarek). Bobby wins the race easily when Joe dives out of his car, but Bobby is unable to get out of the car in time due to his bracelet getting caught on the gearshift. He dies as his car plummets over the cliff into a fiery wreck.

Bobby awakens to find himself aboard a speeding train, which stops at a station housing a huge escalator going up into a bright white light, which one of the attendants refers to as "Uptown". Bobby is denied entry, and Rafferty (Richard Mulligan) appears and explains that he is not yet considered ready and needs to carry out an "assignment" in order to earn his ticket Uptown. After many years in limbo, Bobby is finally given his assignment: he is to return to Earth and act as a guardian angel and friend for Lenny Barnes (Jason Gedrick), a promising high school student who is constantly picked on in school, particularly by school bullies Fred Gallo (Stephen Gregory) and Bill McIntyre (Beau Dremann). However, Bobby is instructed that he is only allowed to reveal himself to Lenny and nobody else.

Bobby helps Lenny by giving him a makeover, assisting him in dealing with Fred and Bill, and helping him win the affection of the hottest girl in school, Sharon (Anne Sawyer). However, Bobby comes to realize that the new lifestyle Lenny is leading is not noble, as it causes him to rebel against everyone, including his parents and long-time friend Melissa (Nancy Valen). Bobby discovers that Lenny's mother is Emily, his former girlfriend, and is married to Joe, the man he was racing when he died. Bobby breaks the rules and reveals himself to Emily to confess his love for her, and Emily informs him that he is Lenny's father.

In a scene reminiscent of the opening sequence, Lenny is challenged to a race of chicken at the local quarry by Fred, Sharon's former boyfriend. Having been told by Rafferty that Lenny will die just as Bobby did earlier, Bobby offers to trade his own chance to move Uptown (essentially, his own immortal soul) to save Lenny's life. Much like Bobby's car race, the race ends with Lenny and Bobby flying over the edge of a cliff, and the car exploding in a fiery wreck. However, Bobby prevents Lenny from dying, and they climb up the cliff together. Bobby helps Lenny see the error of his ways as Lenny reunites with Melissa.

After bidding an emotional goodbye to Lenny, during which he tells him that they will always be best friends, Bobby offers himself to Rafferty to fulfill his end of the bargain by accepting a ride "Downtown" (essentially, to Hell). However, Rafferty explains that this will not be happening. Bobby incredulously asks why, since he had made a deal to trade his own soul for Lenny's second chance at life. Rafferty explains to Bobby that he had learned to love and value someone more than himself, and that is how one earned a ticket Uptown. Bobby and Rafferty fly into the sky on a motorbike, and Bobby boards the escalator to Uptown.

Cast

Soundtrack 
The soundtrack was produced by George Duke and consists of ten songs featured in the movie. The soundtrack was released on vinyl, cassette and as of 2013 it was available digitally through iTunes and Amazon MP3. The vinyl album was taken out of print almost as quickly as it became available due to manufacturing defects on the LP: during the tracks "Animal Attraction" and "Crusin' Tonight" there are several misaligned grooves that transferred to all copies of the LP which caused major skips.

Track listing 
 Joe Lynn Turner - "Heartless"
 Jon Fiore - "The Heavenly Kid (Out on the Edge)"
 Jamie Bond - "Heart of Love"
 Howard Hewett - "Obsession"
 Debra Laws - "Cruisin' Tonight"
 Jamie Bond - "Animal Attraction"
 Mickey Thomas - "Two Minute Love"
 The George Duke Band - "So Mean to Me"
 George Duke - "Hamburgers"
 Neko-Meka - "When the Children Make the Mighty Fall"
 Shandi Sinnamon - "So Far Away"*
 Chris Farren - "Dream Machine"*
 Stuffy Shmitt - "I Need The Touch"*
 Jerry Lee Lewis - "Whole Lotta Shakin' Goin' On"*

* Song is featured in the movie but not on the soundtrack album.

See also
 List of films about angels

Notes and references 
 "Seventh Annual Youth in Film Awards" by Young Artist Foundation, http://www.youngartistawards.org/, July 7, 2006, retrieved July 7, 2006

External links 

1980s English-language films
1980s American films
1980s fantasy comedy films
1980s teen comedy films
1985 films
1985 independent films
1985 romantic comedy films
American auto racing films
American fantasy comedy films
American independent films
American romantic comedy films
American teen comedy films
Films about angels
Films about the afterlife
Orion Pictures films